Khaldin or Khaledin or Khaledeyn may refer to:

Khaledeyn, Hormozgan
Khaldin, Qazvin